The 2020 Canberra Challenger was a professional tennis tournament that was played on outdoor hard courts. It was the fifth edition of the tournament which was a part of the 2020 ATP Challenger Tour. It took place in Bendigo, Australia between 6 and 12 January 2020. The tournament was relocated to Bendigo due to the hazardous air quality in Canberra from the 2019–20 Australian bushfire season.

Singles main-draw entrants

Seeds

 1 Rankings are as of December 30, 2019.

Other entrants
The following players received wildcards into the singles main draw:
 Matthew Ebden
 Jason Kubler
 Max Purcell
 Akira Santillan
 Aleksandar Vukic

The following players received entry from the qualifying draw:
 Harry Bourchier
 Daniel Elahi Galán

The following player received entry as a lucky loser:
  Li Zhe

Champions

Singles

  Philipp Kohlschreiber def.  Emil Ruusuvuori 7–6(7–5), 4–6, 6–3.

Doubles

  Max Purcell /  Luke Saville def.  Jonathan Erlich /  Andrei Vasilevski 7–6(7–3), 7–6(7–3).

References

2020 ATP Challenger Tour
2020 in Australian tennis
January 2020 sports events in Australia
Canberra Challenger